Jayus Hariono (born 27 January 1997) is an Indonesian professional footballer who plays as a defensive midfielder for Liga 1 club Arema.

Club career

Arema
He was signed for Arema to play in Liga 1 in the 2018 season. On 6 October 2018, he made his Arema debut playing the full 90 minutes in a 1–0 league victory over Persebaya Surabaya. On 20 October 2019, as Arema draw 2–2 at Persipura Jayapura, he scored the first goal of his professional career.

Career statistics

Club

Notes

Honours

Club
Arema
 Indonesia President's Cup: 2019, 2022

References

External links
 Jayus Hariono at Soccerway
 Jayus Hariono at Liga Indonesia

1997 births
Living people
Sportspeople from Malang
Sportspeople from East Java
Indonesian footballers
Liga 2 (Indonesia) players
Liga 1 (Indonesia) players
Persekam Metro players
Arema F.C. players
Association football midfielders
People from Malang